Edward Tyrrel Channing (December 12, 1790 – February 8, 1856) was an American rhetorician. He was a professor at Harvard College, brother to William Ellery Channing and Walter Channing, and cousin of Richard Henry Dana Sr.

Biography
Channing was born in Newport, Rhode Island, the son of William and Lucy (Ellery) Channing. In 1807 he graduated from Harvard College, and began the practice of law in Boston, but devoted his attention chiefly to literature. From 1818–1819 he was the second editor of the North American Review after William Tudor (1779-1830), and remained a regular contributor through much of his life.

From 1819–1850 he taught at Harvard as the Boylston Professor of Rhetoric and Oratory, the position held by John Quincy Adams from 1806–1809. (Joseph McKean had served as the second Boylston Professor.) His students included the noted authors and speakers Ralph Waldo Emerson, Thomas Wentworth Higginson, Oliver Wendell Holmes, Sr., James Russell Lowell, Charles Eliot Norton, Wendell Phillips, and Henry David Thoreau. Channing was elected a Fellow of the American Academy of Arts and Sciences in 1823.

Channing married Henrietta Ellery in 1826 and died in Cambridge. A memorial volume of his lectures was published in 1856 with memoir by Richard Henry Dana, Jr.

Selected works 
 An oration, delivered July 4, 1817, at the request of the selectmen of the town of Boston, in commemoration of the anniversary of American independence, Boston: printed by Joseph T. Buckingham, Congress-Street, 1817.
 Lives of William Pinkney, William Ellery, and Cotton Mather, Boston : Hilliard, Gray; London : R. J. Kennett, 1836.
 Lectures on Rhetoric and Oratory, Boston : Ticknor and Fields, 1856.
 "Life of William Ellery," in The Library of American Biography, edited by Jared Sparks, vol. 6 New York: Harper & Brothers, 1848. 89–159.
Lectures Read to the Seniors in Harvard College, Boston, 1856. Facsimile ed., introd. Charlotte Downey, 1997, Scholars' Facsimiles & Reprints, .

Notes

References
 Dorothy C. Broaddus, Genteel Rhetoric: Writing High Culture in Nineteenth-Century Boston, University of South Carolina Press, 1999..

1790 births
1856 deaths
American rhetoricians
Harvard College alumni
Harvard University faculty
Fellows of the American Academy of Arts and Sciences
People from Newport, Rhode Island